Nunca Voy A Olvidarte...Los Exitos is the second greatest hits collection released from Mexican singer Cristian Castro. It was released on October 4, 2005 by Sony Music Latin.

Track listing

Charts

References

Cristian Castro compilation albums
2005 video albums
Music video compilation albums
2005 greatest hits albums
Sony BMG Norte compilation albums
Spanish-language compilation albums
Cristian Castro video albums